Ciminà is a comune (municipality) in the Province of Reggio Calabria in the Italian region Calabria, located about  southwest of Catanzaro and about  northeast of Reggio Calabria.

Ciminà borders the following municipalities: Antonimina, Ardore, Cittanova, Molochio, Platì, Sant'Ilario dello Ionio, Varapodio.

Demographic evolution

References

External links
 Geosite of Ciminà - Southern Geologic Area
 Southern Geologic Area

Cities and towns in Calabria